Eastern Suburbs (now known as the Sydney Roosters) competed in the 22nd New South Wales Rugby League season in 1928.

Details
 Home Ground: Agricultural Ground
 Lineup:- George Boddington(Coach);
• Cyril Abotomey,
• B. Bakewell
• J. Barratt
• Morrie Boyle
• Richard Brown
• Joe Busch
• Harry Caples
• A. Carter
• W.Cole
• Jack Coote
• F. Davies
• Tom Fitzpatrick
• Gordon Fletcher
• Nelson Hardy
• George Harris
• Larry Hedger
• Billy Hong
• Harry Kavanagh
• Joe Pearce
• Norm Pope
• Bill Shankland 
• Ray Stehr
• George Torpy.

Ladder

References

Rugby League Tables and Statistics

Sydney Roosters seasons
East